Melanesotypus is a genus of spiders in the family Corinnidae. It was first described in 2015 by Raven. , it contains only one species, Melanesotypus guadal, from the Solomon Islands.

References

Corinnidae
Monotypic Araneomorphae genera
Spiders of Oceania